Al-Walīd ibn Yazīd (709 – 17 April 744) usually known simply as Al-Walid II was an Umayyad Caliph who ruled from 743 until his assassination in the year 744. He succeeded his uncle, Hisham ibn Abd al-Malik.

Birth and background 
Al-Walid was the son of Umayyad caliph Yazid II and his wife Umm al-Hajjaj bint Muhammad al-Thaqafi in 709. His mother was the daughter of Umayyad official Muhammad ibn Yusuf al-Thaqafi.

His father, Yazid II ruled the Caliphate from 720 to January 724. Yazid II died in Irbid in the Balqa (i.e. Transjordan) subdistrict of Jund Dimashq (military district of Damascus) on 26 Sha'ban 105 AH (28 January 724 CE). His son al-Walid or half-brother Hisham led his funeral prayers. Yazid had intended to appoint al-Walid as his immediate successor, but was persuaded by Maslama to appoint Hisham instead, followed by al-Walid.

Early life 
As al-Walid grew older, Hisham became increasingly displeased with his nephew's behaviour (including an excessive love for poetry and sex) and considered passing the succession to Hisham's son instead. He spoke to al-Walid about his drinking of alcohol and commanded al-Walid to send away his best drinking companion. He also cut off funds to his heir and strongly encouraged him to be more respectful in religious matters.

Following Hisham's accession, He attempted to secure Maslama ibn Hisham as his successor in place of the appointed successor, his predecessor's son al-Walid II. Hisham's initial attempts following the Hajj of 735 to persuade al-Walid to step down in favor of Maslama or give Maslama the oath of allegiance as al-Walid's successor were rejected by al-Walid. Afterward, Hisham sought to undermine al-Walid and secretly gathered support for Maslama. The latter's nomination was supported by his paternal uncle, the famous general Maslama ibn Abd al-Malik, Hisham's maternal grandfather, the former governor of Medina Hisham ibn Isma'il al-Makhzumi, and his sons Ibrahim and Muhammad, and the sons of the influential Banu Abs chief of northern Syria, al-Qa'qa' ibn Khulayd. Maslama's mother Umm Hakim also lobbied for her son's succession. Opposed to Maslama's proposed succession was Khalid al-Qasri, the governor of Iraq, to which Maslama responded by insulting him and his dead brother Asad. Maslama ibn Abd al-Malik's death in the late 730s was a major setback to Hisham's succession plans as it represented the loss of the plan's key supporter in the Umayyad dynasty.
After Hisham death he was succeeded by Al-Walid II in February 743.

Accession 
Hisham died in February 743 and his son Maslama led the funeral prayers. Al-Walid II acceded to the caliphate and immediately ordered that Hisham's sons at Rusafa, near Palmyra, be arrested by their cousin al-Abbas ibn al-Walid, but expressly forbade that Maslama or his household be disturbed in deference to their old companionship and Maslama's defense of al-Walid from Caliph Hisham.

Caliphate 
Al-Walid succeeded to the throne on the death of Hisham on 6 February 743. As heir, al-Walid was known for his open-handedness. As caliph, he took special care of the crippled and blind, increasing their stipend. He named his two sons, al-Hakam and Uthman, to succeed him in that order as documented by a letter dated 21 May 743 in al-Tabari. Tabari also quotes a number of al-Walid's poems.
 
Al-Walid at first confirmed Nasr ibn Sayyar as governor of Khurasan. However, bribed by Yusuf ibn Umar, the caliph dismissed him. Al-Walid appointed his uncle Yusuf ibn Muhammad governor of Medina. At the same time, Yahya ibn Zayd, the son of Zayd ibn Ali, was found in Khurasan. Nasr urged him to present himself to the caliph, to maintain Islamic unity. However, Yahya chose another path and after initial victory was slain.

Al-Walid put Sulayman ibn Hisham in prison. Such a deed, as well as his reputed drinking, singing and immorality aroused opposition. Al-Walid was fond of versifying and he arranged horse races. The upright Yazid ibn al-Walid spoke against the new ruler's moral laxity. A group began plotting his assassination. When approached, Khalid ibn Abdallah al-Qasri declined to join in and even cautioned al-Walid. However, his vague warning aroused al-Walid's ire. He imprisoned Khalid and then gave him to Yusuf ibn Umar for fifty million dirhams. Yusuf tortured and killed Khalid. This intensely angered many of al-Walid's own relatives.

During the reign of al-Walid II, Yazid ibn al-Walid spoke out against Walid's "immorality" which included discrimination on behalf of the Banu Qays Arabs against Yemenis and non-Arab Muslims, and Yazid received further support from the Qadariya and Murji'iya.

Hearing of the plot, Marwan ibn Muhammad wrote from Armenia urging a more prudent course of action, one more promising for the stability of the state and the preservation of the Umayyad house. This was disregarded and many armed men moved into Damascus.

Death 
Yazid slipped into Damascus and deposed al-Walid in a coup, following this up with a disbursement of funds from the treasury. The caliph was besieged in a castle outside the city. He fought well, but on April 16, 744, at Al-Aghdaf, in modern Jordan, he was defeated and killed by the forces of Sulayman ibn Hisham. He was succeeded by his cousin Yazid III.

According to Yazid's own account, Yazid sent Abd al-Aziz ibn al-Hajjaj to meet Walid at al-Bakhra. 'Abd al-Aziz offered to set up a tribal assembly (shura) to decide the future of the realm. Walid rejected this offer and attacked, by which action he lost his life.

Family 
One of Uthman ibn Muhammad ibn Abi Sufyan's, daughter, Atika bint Uthman ibn Muhammad, was wed to the Umayyad caliph al-Walid II.

Al-Walid II had two sons, al-Hakam and Uthman. He nominated them as his successors. After the victory and accession of Yazid III, the latter had Uthman and Hakam imprisoned.

See also
Abd al-Wahid ibn Sulayman

Bibliography 

Muhammad ibn Jarir al-Tabari History, v. 26 "The Waning of the Umayyad Caliphate," transl. Carole Hillenbrand, SUNY, Albany, 1989
Glubb, Sir John, The Empire of the Arabs, Hodder and Stoughton, London, 1963

 Patricia Crone, God's Caliph 1986

References 

709 births
744 deaths
8th-century Arabs
8th-century rulers in Asia
8th-century rulers in Africa
8th-century rulers in Europe
8th-century Umayyad caliphs
Assassinated caliphs
Medieval Arabs killed in battle
8th-century murdered monarchs
8th-century Arabic poets